The Nite-Liters is the debut album by the Louisville, Kentucky group The Nite-Liters, the instrumental ensemble offshoot of New Birth featuring Tony Churchill, James Baker, Robin Russell, Austin Lander, Robert "Lurch" Jackson, Leroy Taylor, Charlie Hearndon, Bruce Marshall and Nathaniel "Nebs" Neblett. Released in 1970 on RCA Records. Produced by mentor Harvey Fuqua.

Track listing
"Get Back Buddy"   	 3:15   	
"Stuff-n-It" 	2:35 	
"Con-Funk-Shun" 	4:49 	
"The Heckler" 	4:00 	
"Cherish Every Precious Moment" 	3:43 	
"Pretty Words Don't Mean a Thing (Lie To Me)" 	2:33 	
"Down and Dirty" 	2:51 	
"Nothing (Can Make Me Love You More Than I Do)" 	3:35 	
"Itchy Brother" 	3:03 	
"Horny Man" 	3:15 	
"Snap Your Twig" 	3:25 	
"Eleanor Rigby" 	5:18

External links
 The Nite-Liters-The Nite-Liters at Discogs

References

1970 debut albums
The Nite-Liters albums
RCA Records albums
Albums produced by Harvey Fuqua